"Simple Song #3" or "Simple Song Number 3" is an original song sung by South Korean singer Sumi Jo. The song was released as the lead single from the soundtrack album of 2015 film Youth written and composed by American composer David Lang. 

"Simple Song #3" was nominated for the 2016 Academy Award, Golden Globe Award and Critics Choice Award for best original song.

Production
American composer David Lang wrote the music, including the piece "Simple Songs," which is fictionally performed for Queen Elizabeth at the end of the movie. The scene was shot with soprano Sumi Jo, violinist Viktoria Mullova, the BBC Concert Orchestra, and the Berlin Radio Choir.

Accolades

References

External links
 
 Simple Song#3 at Oscars.org 
 Youth album
 

2015 singles
2015 songs